The 1963 SMU Mustangs football team represented Southern Methodist University (SMU) as a member of the Southwest Conference (SWC) during the 1963 NCAA University Division football season. Led by second-year head coach Hayden Fry, the Mustangs compiled an overall record of 4–7 with a conference mark of 2–5, tying for sixth place in the SWC. SMU was invited to the Sun Bowl, where they lost to Oregon.

Schedule

References

SMU
SMU Mustangs football seasons
SMU Mustangs football